Adrián García and Leonardo Mayer were the defending champions, but they chose to not participate this year.
Marcelo Demoliner and Rodrigo Guidolin won in the final 7–5, 4–6, [13–11], against Rogério Dutra da Silva and Júlio Silva.

Seeds

Draw

Draw

References
 Doubles Draw

Aberto Santa Catarina de Tenis - Doubles
2009 Doubles